In Ireland, direct elections by universal suffrage are used for the President, the ceremonial head of state; for Dáil Éireann, the house of representatives of the Oireachtas or parliament; for the European Parliament; and for local government. All elections use proportional representation by means of the single transferable vote (PR-STV) in constituencies returning three or more members, except that the presidential election and by-elections use the single-winner analogue of STV, elsewhere called instant-runoff voting or the alternative vote. Members of Seanad Éireann, the second house of the Oireachtas, are partly nominated, partly indirectly elected, and partly elected by graduates of particular universities.

Coalition governments have been the norm since 1989. Fine Gael (or its predecessor Cumann na nGaedheal) or Fianna Fáil have led every government since independence in 1922. The current government is a coalition of Fianna Fáil, Fine Gael and the Green Party. Traditionally, the Labour Party was the third party, although since 2016 it has been surpassed by Sinn Féin, and since 2020 by the Green Party. Smaller parties and independents exist in the Dáil and more so in local government.

Since 2023, electoral operations and oversight of electoral integrity have been carried out by an independent Electoral Commission.

Eligibility to vote

Entitlement to vote is based on citizenship. Residents of the state who are Irish citizens or British citizens may vote in elections to Dáil Éireann, the lower house of the Oireachtas (parliament). Residents who are citizens of any EU state may vote in European Parliament elections, while any resident, regardless of citizenship, may vote in local elections.

The right of Irish expatriates to vote is heavily restricted. Only members of the armed forces and diplomatic staff abroad may vote in Dáil elections, while only expatriates who are graduates of the National University of Ireland or Trinity College Dublin may vote in Seanad elections to the university constituencies.

Early voting
Military personnel, whether serving at home or abroad, vote by postal ballot. These votes are delivered by a courier service, usually a commercial one, but a military courier is used for ballots cast by Irish troops in Lebanon and Syria. Voters living on islands off the west coast in Galway, Mayo, and Donegal traditionally voted two or three days before polling day, but in 2014 the gap was narrowed, when they voted just one day beforehand. Following an amendment to electoral law in 2022, early voting on the islands is allowed only in exceptional circumstances.

General elections

Under the Constitution, the term of a Dáil is a maximum of seven years; statute law, currently the Electoral Act 1992, establishes a lower maximum of five years. The Taoiseach may advise the president to dissolve at any time. If a Taoiseach has ceased to retain the support of the majority of the Dáil, the president may in their absolute discretion refuse to dissolve the Dáil. To date, no president has refused to dissolve the Dáil. Since 1981, constituencies had been redrawn by an independent Constituency Commission after each census, which was put on a statutory basis in 1997. From 2023, these functions have been carried out by the Electoral Commission

The erection and removal of campaign posters by candidates is governed by the Litter Pollution Act 1997 and the Electoral (Amendment) (No. 2) Act 2009. Posters may only be erected for a certain specified time period before an election. This time period is either (a) 30 days before the poll date or (b) from the date the polling day order for the election has been made, whichever provides the shorter period of time. Posters must be removed within 7 days of polling day.

Footnotes

Seanad elections
Elections to Seanad Éireann take place after the general election to the Dáil. There are sixty members of the Seanad. Of these, eleven are nominated by the Taoiseach appointed next after the dissolution of the Dáil. Six are elected by STV in university constituencies: three for the National University (by graduates) and three for Dublin University (by graduates and scholars of Trinity College Dublin). Forty-three are elected by an electorate of serving politicians (members of the incoming Dáil, the outgoing Seanad, and city and county councillors) for five vocational panels. These elections are also counted using STV, although using a different set of rules on the distribution of surpluses and the order of counts than in other elections in Ireland.

European elections
Elections to the European Parliament are held simultaneously across Europe every five years. In Ireland, as for Dáil elections, STV is used in constituencies returning three to five members. Ireland has 13 seats in the European Parliament.

Local elections
Elections to county councils, city councils and city and county councils are held every five years and by convention take place on the same day as European elections. Local electoral areas (LEAs) return between three and seven councillors by STV. Until the Local Government Reform Act 2014, elections were also held for borough and town councils. The 2014 Act abolished borough and town councils with their functions transferred to municipal districts of the county councils, comprising the county councillors from the LEA coterminous with the district.

Some members of Údarás na Gaeltachta were directly elected by Gaeltacht residents between 1980 and 2012; since then all have been appointed by the government.

Presidential elections

The President of Ireland is formally elected by the citizens of Ireland once in every seven years, except in the event of premature vacancy, when an election must be held within sixty days. The President is directly elected by secret ballot under the system of the instant-runoff voting (although the Constitution describes it as "the system of proportional representation by means of the single transferable vote"). While both Irish and British citizens resident in the state may vote in Dáil elections, only Irish citizens, who must be at least eighteen years of age, may vote in the election of the President. The presidency is open to all citizens of the state who are at least 35. A candidate must be nominated by one of the following:

Twenty members of the Oireachtas (Dáil or Seanad).
Four local authorities.
Themselves (in the case of an incumbent or former president who has served only one term).

Where only one candidate is nominated, that candidate is declared elected without a ballot. No one may serve as President for more than two terms.

Referendums
The Constitution of Ireland recognises two types of referendums:
On a proposed amendment to the Constitution, for which a referendum is always required, and the amendment is defeated by a majority of those voting;
An ordinary referendum, on a bill other than an amendment to the Constitution, for which a referendum is only required on petition of Oireachtas members, and the bill is defeated by a majority of those  to vote.

There have been 38 referendums for amendments to the Constitution of Ireland. There have been no ordinary referendums. From 1998 to 2019, a Referendum Commission was established for each referendum to provide neutral information. From 2023, this function is carried out by the Electoral Commission. An organisation can register with the commission as an "approved body" in order to campaign publicly for or against the proposal, and to have monitors in polling stations and counting agents at count centres.

The Constitution of Ireland was approved by plebiscite on 1 July 1937.

For a proposal to change the name of a place, a plebiscite is required. The current 1956 regulations on conducting such plebiscites relate to a postal vote of ratepayers; in 2019 the relevant electorate was changed from ratepayers to local electors, but  the regulations have not been updated accordingly. The Official Languages Act 2003 prevented the plebiscite provision applying to places in the Gaeltacht, and so a 2005 plebiscite to change the name of Dingle, County Kerry was ruled invalid; in 2011 the 2003 act was amended to remove the restriction.

See also
Voting system
Dáil vote for Taoiseach
Politics of the Republic of Ireland
Elections in Northern Ireland

References

External links
Citizens Information: Elections and referenda
Adam Carr's Election Archive
Parties and elections
NSD: European Election Database – Ireland publishes regional level election data; allows for comparisons of election results, 1992–2007
ElectionsIreland.org, produced in association with Seán Donnelly, author of various books on Irish elections
Ireland Election - Irish Election Results - General, Local, Presidential, Referendum

 
Elections in Ireland